Golay or '''Gholay ગોલાય ગામની દક્ષિણમાં ગુનાઊ ઉત્તર-પૂર્વમાં રોહારા ગામ છે અને પશ્ચિમમાં ભગોડી વાંઢ અને મેડી ગામ નાં સિમાડા લાગે છે આ ગામમાં ખાસ કરીને એક જ પરિવારના લોકો વસવાટ કરે છે જે કેર જાતીય સંબંધ છે મધ્યપૂર્વમાં મોટી બેર અને નાની બેર ગામની સીમાડા છે is a village of Abdasa Taluka of Kutch district of Gujarat, India.

History
Under the Chavda rule, it was known as Sarasgar Pattan, was, until superseded by Jakhau, a place of some importance.

About a mile west of Golay, is a domed stone and brick building, twenty-six feet square and twenty-eight high, said to be the tomb of Mod the son of Jakhara, and to have been built in the fourteenth century by his son Jam Manai II.

References

 This article incorporates Public Domain text from 

Villages in Kutch district